The Steven F. Udvar-Hazy Center, also called the Udvar-Hazy Center, is the Smithsonian National Air and Space Museum (NASM)'s annex at Washington Dulles International Airport in the Chantilly area of Fairfax County, Virginia. It holds numerous exhibits, including the Space Shuttle Discovery, the Enola Gay, and the Boeing 367-80, the prototype for the popular Boeing 707 airliner.

The  facility was made possible by a $65 million donation in October 1999 to the Smithsonian Institution by Steven F. Udvar-Házy, an immigrant from Hungary and co-founder of the International Lease Finance Corporation, an aircraft leasing corporation. The main NASM building, located on the National Mall in Washington, D.C., had always contained more artifacts than could be displayed, and most of the collection had been stored, unavailable to visitors, at the Paul E. Garber Preservation, Restoration, and Storage Facility in Silver Hill, Maryland. A substantial addition to the center encompassing restoration, conservation and collection-storage facilities was completed in 2010. Restoration facilities and museum archives were moved from the museum's Garber facility to the new sections of the Udvar-Hazy Center.

Architecture and facilities

Designed by Hellmuth, Obata, and Kassabaum, who also designed the National Air and Space Museum building, the Center required 15 years of preparation and was built by Hensel Phelps Construction Co. The exhibition areas comprise two large hangars, the  Boeing Aviation Hangar and the  James S. McDonnell Space Hangar. The Donald D. Engen Observation Tower provides a view of landing operations at adjacent Washington Dulles International Airport. The museum also contains an IMAX theater. A taxiway connects the museum to the airport.

An expansion of the Udvar-Hazy Center is dedicated to the behind-the-scenes care of the Smithsonian's collection of aircraft, spacecraft, related artifacts and archival materials. On December 2, 2008, the Steven F. Udvar-Hazy Center received a gift of $6 million for phase two from Airbus Americas Inc. — the largest corporate gift to the Smithsonian Institution in 2008.

The wing includes:

 The Mary Baker Engen Restoration Hangar — spacious enough to accommodate several aircraft at one time with a second-floor viewing area designed to give visitors a behind-the-scenes look.
 Archives — the foremost collection of documentary records of the history, science and technology of aeronautics and space flight will be housed in a single location for the first time, providing researchers with ample space and equipment.
 The Emil Buehler Conservation Laboratory —  provides conservators much-needed space to develop and execute specialized preservation strategies for artifacts.
 Collections processing unit — a dedicated loading dock and specially designed secure area for initial inspection and analysis of artifacts.

A further expansion of the collections center was approved in December 2016. The addition will be made up of three additional storage modules on the south side of the building.

Collection

The center was opened on December 15, 2003. The Udvar-Hazy Center displays historic aviation and space artifacts, especially items too large for the National Air and Space Museum's building on the National Mall, including:

 The Enola Gay, the Boeing B-29 Superfortress which dropped the first atomic bomb on Hiroshima, Japan
 The orbital spacecraft Space Shuttle Space Shuttle Discovery was put on public display in the James S. McDonnell Space Hangar on April 19, 2012, replacing the atmospheric test vehicle, Space Shuttle Enterprise.
 A first-generation tracking and data relay satellite (TDRS) that hangs directly above Space Shuttle Discovery
 The Gemini 7 space capsule
 A Lockheed SR-71 Blackbird reconnaissance aircraft
 An Air France Concorde supersonic airliner
 A United States Air Force Lockheed L-1049 Super Constellation, the military version of the Lockheed Constellation ("Connie") airliner
 The Boeing 367-80 ("Dash-80") jet transport, which was the prototype for the KC-135 tanker and the 707 airliner
 The only surviving Bell XV-15 experimental tiltrotor craft
 A PGM-11 Redstone rocket
 A SAM-N-2 Lark like the one which scored the first successful United States surface-to-air missile interception of a flying target
 The only surviving Verville-Sperry M-1 Messenger, the USAAS's first messenger aircraft
 The Langley Aerodrome A, an early attempt at powered flight by Smithsonian Secretary Samuel Pierpont Langley
 The Northrop N-1 experimental aircraft
 The only surviving Boeing 307 Stratoliner, the ex-Pan Am Clipper Flying Cloud
 One of two surviving German Heinkel He 219 Uhu night fighters
 The only surviving German Dornier Do 335 Pfeil fighter
 The only surviving German Horten Ho 229 prototype flying wing jet fighter/bomber
 The only surviving German Arado Ar 234 Blitz jet bomber
 The only surviving German Horten H.VI flying wing aircraft
 One of three surviving German Bachem Ba 349 Natter rocket-powered interceptors
 The only surviving Japanese Nakajima J1N1-S Gekko
 The only surviving Japanese Aichi M6A1 Seiran
 The only surviving Japanese Kyushu J7W Shinden
 One of four surviving Northrop P-61 Black Widow night fighters
 One of two surviving Boeing P-26 Peashooter fighters
 A Bede BD-5, single-seat, home-built aircraft that was somewhat popular in the 1970s (5J version is the smallest crewed jet aircraft)
 The Beck-Mahoney Sorceress, known as the "winningest" racing biplane in aviation history
 A British Hawker Hurricane fighter
 A Japanese balloon bomb like the one that killed six U.S. civilians in Oregon during World War II
 Lockheed Martin X-35 Joint Strike Fighter, prototype of the Lockheed Martin F-35 Lightning II
 Grumman F-14 Tomcat fighter involved in the Gulf of Sidra incident (1989). 
 The Gossamer Albatross, which was the first man-powered aircraft to fly across the English Channel
 The primary special-effects miniature of the "Mothership" used in the filming of Close Encounters of the Third Kind
 The Virgin Atlantic GlobalFlyer piloted by Steve Fossett for the first solo nonstop and nonrefueled circumnavigation of Earth
 The Winnie Mae, a Lockheed Vega piloted by Wiley Post
 The first aircraft operated by FedEx, a Dassault Falcon 20
 A piece of fabric from the LZ 129 Hindenburg that survived the Hindenburg disaster.
 Mercury-Atlas 10 unused Project Mercury spacecraft
 U.S. Coast Guard Sikorsky HH-52 Seaguard helicopter
 A Sikorsky JRS-1 twin-engine aircraft, one of only three surviving aircraft from the Attack on Pearl Harbor
 A Launch Entry Suit
 A Vought RF-8 Crusader reconnaissance aircraft
 A McDonnell Douglas F-4S Phantom II fighter
 A Soviet Mikoyan-Gurevich MiG-15 fighter
 The NASA Pathfinder, an early solar powered aircraft
 A Piasecki PV-2 helicopter
 A French Caudron G.4 bomber
 A German Focke-Wulf Fw 190F fighter/bomber
 A British Westland Lysander Army cooperation aircraft
 A CASA 352L transport
 A Republic F-105D Thunderchief fighter-bomber
 A Lockheed P-38 Lightning fighter
 Darryl Greenamyer's Grumman F8F Bearcat "Conquest I" racing aircraft
 The North American P-51C Mustang "Excalibur III" fighter
 A North American F-86 Sabre fighter
 A Republic P-47 Thunderbolt fighter
 A Grumman F6F-3 Hellcat fighter
 A Soviet Mikoyan-Gurevich MiG-21 "Fishbed" fighter
 A Beechcraft Bonanza
 A Beechcraft Model 18
 A Bell 47 helicopter
 A Bell H-13 Sioux helicopter
 A Bell UH-1 Iroquois helicopter
 A Boeing-Stearman Model 75 biplane trainer aircraft
 A Grumman A-6E Intruder ground-attack aircraft
 A Curtiss P-40E Kittyhawk fighter
 A Vought F4U-1D Corsair fighter
 A Piper J-3 Cub
 A Grumman G-22 Gulfhawk II
 An Aeronca C-2 ultralight aircraft
 The Stanley Nomad glider
 An Arrow Sport A2
 A Space Systems/Loral FS-1300 communications satellite, previously a ground spare for Sirius Satellite Radio
 The Shuttle Radar Topography Mission payload that flew on STS-99.
 Bob Hoover's Shrike Commander
 Gondola of Breitling Orbiter 3, the first balloon to fly around the world non-stop
 Gondola C-49 of Goodyear Blimp Columbia (N4A), class GZ-20, and Gondola of Goodyear Pilgrim
A Ohka "Cherry Blossom" aircraft. Used a warhead at the tip, and was used for kamikaze.

The museum is still in the process of installing exhibits, and 169 aircraft and 152 large space artifacts were on display as of May 2012, and plans call for the eventual installation of over 200 aircraft. The current list is maintained at the Objects On Display page of the Smithsonian Institution NASM Collections site.

Events 
A number of events are held at the museum throughout the year. These include lectures, book signings, sleepovers, and events for children. Some of the museum's larger events include Air & Scare for Halloween, an open house, and Innovations in Flight: Family Day and Outdoor Aviation Display.

Media appearances
The center made its first media appearance in the 2009 film Transformers: Revenge of the Fallen. The center remained open while filming took place, although certain areas were closed. The SR-71 that is on display in the museum was used as Jetfire, a Decepticon who switches sides to become an Autobot, in the film. In the film, it is referred to simply as the National Air and Space Museum.

See also
List of aerospace museums

References

External links

2003 establishments in Virginia
Aerospace museums in Virginia
Museums established in 2003
Museums in Fairfax County, Virginia
Smithsonian Institution museums
Space Shuttle tourist attractions
Dulles International Airport